Brachinus angustatus is a species of ground beetle from the Carabinae subfamily that can be found in Spain and North African countries such as Algeria and Morocco. Brachinus angustatus was one of the many beetles found in the collection of Count Pierre François Marie Auguste Dejean

References

Beetles described in 1831
Beetles of Asia
Beetles of Europe
Brachininae